Mount Pleasant City Hall is the official seat of government of the city of Mount Pleasant, Iowa, United States.  This 1½-story stone structure was designed by Burlington, Iowa architect William Weibley, and constructed by local builder K.A. Bergdahl.  It is an eclectic combination of Colonial Revival styles.  For the most part it reflects Georgian Revival aesthetics with its symmetrical facade and the pilasters that flank the main entrance.  The stepped ends of the gable roof and the projecting gable above the main entrance reflect the Dutch Revival influence.  The random ashlar stone used in its construction was salvaged from the Seeley Memorial YMCA-high school that was destroyed in a 1932 fire. The city hall's construction in 1936 was a Works Progress Administration project. The east wing, which has been altered from its original appearance, originally housed the city's police and fire departments before they moved to their own buildings. City hall was listed on the National Register of Historic Places in 1991.

References

Government buildings completed in 1936
Buildings and structures in Mount Pleasant, Iowa
National Register of Historic Places in Henry County, Iowa
City and town halls on the National Register of Historic Places in Iowa
City and town halls in Iowa
Works Progress Administration in Iowa
Colonial Revival architecture in Iowa